Neil Ross (born 10 August 1982) is an English football coach and former professional footballer who was most recently manager of Farsley Celtic. He currently serves as assistant coach at Bruno's Magpies, where he is also in charge of their U23 team.

Career
Born in West Bromwich, Ross began his career as a trainee at Leeds United in 1999 but made no appearances for the club and joined Stockport County on a free transfer in April 2000. He made nine league appearances, scoring two goals, and had a loan spell at Bristol Rovers, in two-and-a-half seasons at Stockport. He joined Macclesfield Town in January 2003, after initially failing to agree personal terms, and was allowed to go to Conference National side Northwich Victoria on a one-month loan in September 2003 to get match practice. He made 14 appearances for Macclesfield Town without scoring, but did not form part of manager Brian Horton's plans for the 2004–05 season and was placed on the transfer list in August 2004. He joined Tamworth on a one-month loan in the same month, where he scored twice in seven games.

Ross joined Conference National club Halifax Town in November 2004 until the end of the 2004–05 season. He later played for Alfreton Town, Bradford Park Avenue, Ossett Town, Ilkeston Town, and Buxton before returning to Halifax Town, now playing in the Northern Premier League Division One North, in July 2008.

In November 2021 he was appointed first team manager at Farsley Celtic, having been the club's under-19 and under-23 manager since 2018. However, he left the club in January 2022.In 2023 he is now managing in Gibraltar Intermediate League magpies

References

External links

1982 births
Living people
Sportspeople from West Bromwich
English footballers
Association football forwards
Leeds United F.C. players
Stockport County F.C. players
Bristol Rovers F.C. players
Macclesfield Town F.C. players
Northwich Victoria F.C. players
Tamworth F.C. players
Halifax Town A.F.C. players
Alfreton Town F.C. players
Bradford (Park Avenue) A.F.C. players
Ossett Town F.C. players
Ilkeston Town F.C. (1945) players
Buxton F.C. players
FC Halifax Town players
Harrogate Railway Athletic F.C. players
English Football League players
Northern Premier League players
Farsley Celtic F.C. managers